Carpophorus, Exanthus, Cassius, Severinus, Secundus and Licinius (all died circa 295 AD) were Christian soldiers who, according to tradition, were martyred at Como during the reign of Maximian.

Legends

The cult of Fidelis of Como is associated with these saints.  Variations on more or less the same legend concern them.  The first says that he, with Carpophorus and Exanthus, were Roman soldiers (members of the famed Theban Legion) who deserted during the persecution of Christians by Maximian.  They were caught and executed at Como.  The second says that Fidelis was an army officer who was guarding Christian prisoners at Milan, including Saint Alexander of Bergamo.  He managed to procure the freedom of five of these prisoners.  With Carpophorus and Exanthus, he and these five attempted to make their way to the Alps, but were executed at Como.  The martyrdom is considered to have occurred on the north side of Lake Como, near Samolaco.
 
Their feast day is August 7.  The church of San Carpoforo at Como, was, according to tradition, founded re-using a former temple of Mercury to house the remains of Carpophorus and other local martyrs.

Just Carpophorus was often venerated with Fidelis of Como, and both saints were in turn venerated at Arona with two other soldier saints, Felinus and Gratian, on a joint feast day of March 13.

Notes

External links
Saints of August 7

Groups of Christian martyrs of the Roman era
290s deaths
3rd-century Christian martyrs
Year of birth unknown